Arab City Schools is the public school district of Arab, Alabama.

Schools
It includes the following schools:
Arab High School
Arab Junior High School
Arab Primary School
Arab Elementary School

Arab City Schools has a total enrollment of approximately 2,609 students.

References

External links

 

School districts in Alabama
Huntsville-Decatur, AL Combined Statistical Area
Education in Marshall County, Alabama